Almelo de Riet is a railway station located in Almelo, Netherlands. The station was opened on 3 October 1926 and is located on the Almelo-Salzbergen railway line. Previously, the station was simply called De Riet. (1926-1965)

Train services

Bus services

There is no bus service at this station.

References

NS website 
Dutch Public Transport journey planner 

Railway stations in Overijssel
Railway stations in Germany opened in 1926
Railway stations on the Almelo - Salzbergen railway line
Almelo